This is a list of monuments that are classified by the Moroccan ministry of culture around Safi, Morocco.

Monuments and sites in Safi 

|}

References 

Safi
Safi, Morocco